Leuna is a town in Saxony-Anhalt, eastern Germany, south of Merseburg and Halle, on the river Saale.

The town is known for the Leunawerke, at 13 km2 one of the biggest chemical industrial complexes in Germany, where a very wide range of chemicals and plastics is produced.

In 1960, Leuna's population was nearly 10,000, but after reunification high unemployment rates and poor living conditions, including pollution from nearby industries, caused significant outward migration. Before the 31 December 2009 incorporation of ten neighbouring municipalities, its population had declined to 6,670.

Geography
The town Leuna consists of Leuna proper and the following 10 Ortschaften or municipal divisions:

Friedensdorf
Günthersdorf
Horburg-Maßlau
Kötschlitz
Kötzschau
Kreypau
Rodden
Spergau
Zöschen
Zweimen

Economy 

Leuna's industrial site stretches over 13 km², making it one of the largest chemical industry sites in Germany in terms of geographical area. At the beginning of the 21st century, a wide range of chemical products and plastics are made there. A pilot plant to produce isobutylene from vegetal stock is being built by the French company Global Bioenergies and should start during 2016.

Notable people 

 Christian August Crusius (1715–1775), philosopher and evangelical theologian
 Wolfram Adolphi (born 1951), journalist and political scientist

References

 
Oil campaign of World War II
Towns in Saxony-Anhalt
Saalekreis